American rapper Lil Tecca has released two studio albums, one mixtape, and twenty-one singles (including three as a featured artist).

Albums

Studio albums

Mixtapes

Singles

As lead artist

As featured artist

Other charted songs

Guest appearances

Notes

References 

Discographies of American artists